State Line Avenue is a north–south arterial road in Texarkana, United States. The street's centerline does not follow the state boundary precisely, but the southbound lanes of State Line Avenue are located in Texarkana, Texas (Bowie County), and the northbound lanes are in Texarkana, Arkansas (Miller County). State Line Avenue consists of two non-continuous portions, separated by a one-mile (1.6 km) gap directly south of the downtown area.

State Line Avenue's southern terminus is at Broad Street, but until 1980 it terminated at Texarkana Union Station. At the west end of downtown, the "Texas Viaduct" carries traffic over a rail yard to South State Line Avenue.

From here, State Line Avenue continues north through downtown Texarkana, where the street splits apart and the traffic island in the middle is occupied by the city's U.S. Post Office and Federal Building, the only such building to be located in two states. One block north, State Line Avenue crosses US 67/US 71/US 82 and continues north carrying US 71, which intersects from the east only.

Because Bowie County, Texas, is a dry county, several liquor stores line the Arkansas side of midtown State Line Avenue. Customers from Texas regularly cross the state line to purchase alcoholic beverages. State Line Road travels north carrying US 71, lined with retail outlets, for about  more before intersecting I-30. Here, there is a concentration of hotels dominating all four quadrants of the interchange, with over a dozen different lodging chains being represented here. Also at this interchange, US 59 ends its  concurrency with I-30 by exiting the freeway from the west and traveling north along State Line Avenue/US 71.

Continuing north, State Line Avenue carries the US 59/US 71 concurrency until the Red River bridge.

Destinations

References

Texarkana
Landmarks in Arkansas
Landmarks in Texas
Streets in Arkansas
Streets in Texas
Texarkana, Arkansas
Texarkana, Texas
U.S. Route 59
U.S. Route 71